Oglasa costimacula is a moth of the family Noctuidae. It is found in Taiwan and on Borneo. The habitat consists of alluvial forests.

The anterior arc of the forewing submarginal area encloses a dark brown area at the margin.

References

Moths described in 1915
Calpinae
Moths of Asia